Henrik Urban Brodersen (born 3 June 1964 in Skælskør) is a Danish politician, who was a member of the Folketing for the Danish People's Party from 2007 to 2011 and again from 2015 to 2019.

Political career
Brodersen sat in the municipal council of Skælskør Municipality from 2002 to 2006, where the municipality was merged with Slagelse, Hashøj and Korsør Municipality to form a new Slagelse Municipality. Brodersen has been in the new Slagelse Municipality's municipal council since its foundation in 2007. From 2014 to 2015 he sat in the regional council of Region Zealand.

Brodersen first entered parliament as a substitute member three times during the 2005–2007 term: from 1 March to 16 June 2005, 27 October to 4 November 2005 and 13 March to 28 May 2007. At the 2007 Danish general election he was elected into parliament on his own mandate. He was not reelected in 2011, but was elected back in at the 2015 election. He was not reelected at the 2019 election.

References

External links 
 Biography on the website of the Danish Parliament (Folketinget)

Living people
1964 births
People from Slagelse Municipality
Danish People's Party politicians
Danish municipal councillors
Members of the Folketing 2007–2011
Members of the Folketing 2015–2019